The 1984 NAIA Division II football season, as part of the 1984 college football season in the United States and the 29th season of college football sponsored by the NAIA, was the 15th season of play of the NAIA's lower division for football.

The season was played from August to November 1984 and culminated in the 1984 NAIA Division II Football National Championship, played at Maxwell Field on the campus of Linfield College in McMinnville, Oregon.

Conference changes

Conference changes
 This was the final season of play for the Pacific Northwest Conference. The PNC's five football-playing members from Oregon and Washington would join the new, football-only Columbia Football League while the conference itself would rebrand as the Northwest Conference. Under this new name, the league would later re-sponsor football in 1996 before transitioning to NCAA Division III in 1998.

Conference standings

Conference champions

Postseason

See also
 1984 NAIA Division I football season
 1984 NCAA Division I-A football season
 1984 NCAA Division I-AA football season
 1984 NCAA Division II football season
 1984 NCAA Division III football season

References

 
NAIA Football National Championship